Awaking the Centuries is the second full-length album by German symphonic metal band Haggard. It was released on 7 February 2000 by Drakkar Entertainment. The album is based on Michel De Nostredame (Nostradamus) and his experience during The Black Plague in Medieval Europe. The album features several compositions based on Sergei Rachmaninoff's music.

Awakening the Centuries peaked at position 64 in the German album charts.

Track listing

Note
The choir tracks at the beginning and at the end of the record are an abridged and a complete version of "Rejoice, o virgin" from Sergei Rachmaninoff's choral work All-Night Vigil.

Personnel

Asis Nasseri – grunt vocals, guitars, kettle drums
Luz Marsen – drums, percussion
Andi Nad – bass
Danny Klupp – guitars
Karin Bodenmüller – soprano
Hans Wolf – grand piano, piano, church organ  keyboards
Kathrin Pechlof – concert harp
Fiffi Fuhrmann – tenore
Christian – tenore
Thomas Rosato – bass
Christoph Zastrow – flute
Florian Bartl – oboe
Robert Müller – clarinet
Andrea Sterr – violin
Michael Stapf – violin
Steffi Hertz – viola
Kathrin Hertz – violoncello
Georg Uttenthaler – doublebass
Florian Schnellinger – percussion
Peter Prysch – French horn

Guest musicians 
Evert Fratermann – orchestral percussion
Ilka Mende – violin
Fabian Schwarz – acoustic guitars

Voices of "Pestilencia" 
Ulrich Mühlmann – "Nostradamus"
Carsten Jacob – "Monk"
Christiane B.Horn – "Woman 1"
Eveline Gerhardt – "Woman 2"
Wolfgang Weißmüller – "Man"

Moscow Radio Choir 
Elena Rastvorova – conductor
Olga Uschakova – soprano
Maria Kutuzova – soprano
Ekaterina Oblesova – alto
Katja Prasolova – alto
Vladimir Tarasov – tenor
Oleg Kuzmin – tenor
Anton Vasiljev – bass
Evgeny Astafurov – bass

References

External links
 Awaking the Centuries at Encyclopaedia Metallum

2000 albums
Haggard (band) albums
Drakkar Entertainment albums